Mohd Arsad bin Bistari is a Malaysian politician from Parti Gagasan Rakyat Sabah, a component party of the Gabungan Rakyat Sabah (GRS) coalition. He has been the Member of Sabah State Legislative Assembly for Tempasuk since 2020.

Election result

Honours 
  :
  Commander of the Order of Kinabalu (PGDK) - Datuk (2022)

References 

21st-century Malaysian politicians
Malaysian Muslims
Place of birth missing (living people)
United Malays National Organisation politicians
Bajau people
Members of the Sabah State Legislative Assembly
Living people
Year of birth missing (living people)
Commanders of the Order of Kinabalu